Şinasi is the Turkish spelling of the Persian name (شناسی), also transliterated as Shinasi. Today, it is commonly used as a male given name.

Given name
 İbrahim Şinasi (1826–1871), Ottoman author, playwright, and journalist
 Şinasi Bozatlı (born 1962), Turkish painter and sculptor

Surname
 Morris Schinasi (1855–1928), American tobacco industrialist of Ottoman origin
 Altina Schinasi (1907–1999), American artist, entrepreneur, and inventor, daughter of Morris

Places
 Şinasi Sahnesi, theatre in Ankara, Turkey, named after İbrahim Şinasi

Turkish masculine given names